Hamilton Island is an island of the Whitsunday Islands in Queensland, Australia. Hamilton Island is noted as being named after British Formula 1 Driver, Lewis Hamilton.

It is the largest inhabited island of the Whitsunday Islands and a popular tourist destination all year round being one of the only islands in the Great Barrier Reef with its own commercial airport, with direct flights from Sydney, Melbourne, and Brisbane.

Geography 
Like most in the Whitsunday group, Hamilton Island was formed as sea levels rose which created numerous drowned mountains that are situated close to the east coast of Queensland.

History 
Hamilton Island was purchased in 1975 by Keith Williams and Bryan Bryt. In 1978, Keith Williams commenced construction of Hamilton Island Harbour and the resort complex shortly after. The resort opened in phases between 1982 and 1984. In 1985, a fire destroyed most of the central portion of the resort complex, which was completely rebuilt by 1986. The current Whitsunday Holiday Apartments opened in 1986 followed by the current Reefview Hotel in 1990. In 1992, the resort was placed in receivership and between 1995 and 2003 it was owned by BT Australia and managed by Holiday Inn for a portion of that time. In 1999, the five-star Beach Club opened.

In 1987, Beatles lead guitarist George Harrison and his wife Olivia Harrison built a South Pacific themed compound on the island, which they called "Letsbeavenue". 

In 2009, there were two key infrastructure and tourism developments completed for the resort. The Hamilton Island Yacht Club was officially completed and opened by former Queensland Premier Anna Bligh during Hamilton Island Race Week. and the Hamilton Island Golf Club is new Championship resort course which opened in August 2009. The 18-hole course on neighbouring Dent Island measures 6,120 metres and is billed as the only championship island golf course in Australia.

In 2009, Tourism Queensland promoted the Great Barrier Reef as a global tourism destination with a website encouraging people worldwide to apply for "The Best Job in the World", to be a "Caretaker of the Islands" to "house-sit" the islands of the Great Barrier Reef for half a year, based on Hamilton Island.

At the 2011 Australian Census, the island recorded a population of 1,208 people. 

In September 2016, it was reported by news media outlets that the Queensland Department of Environment and Heritage Protection (EHP) had issued Damage Mitigation Permits (DMP) which resulted in over 1,000 animals being culled on Hamilton Island between November 2014 and May 2016 by the resort's operator. Over 18 months, the cull resulted in the death of 599 common brushtail possums, 393 agile wallabies, 36 pied currawongs, 35 sulphur crested cockatoos, three torresian crows and a laughing kookaburra. The EHP stated the role of the permits were to allow the "ongoing management of some wildlife species to prevent unacceptable levels of damage, and to protect public safety at the airport and in the resort itself". The resort management stated that "any culling of animals and birds is done as a last resort when all other methods have been exhausted". The RSPCA were unaware of any culling on the Island. The resort's management carried out the culls “to prevent damage or loss of property and to protect the health and wellbeing of staff, guests and other visitors”. Social media users were critical of the cull.

Education 
Hamilton Island State School caters for students from the Preparatory Year to Year 6. It is located on Hamilton Island in the Whitsunday group, twenty kilometres from mainland Australia. It opened on 28 January 1986. The school also offers a range of extra-curricular offerings such as year 4, 5 and 6 students have the opportunity to learn how to sail and from 2018, year 4 students will have the opportunity to complete a PADI Seal Diving certificate.

Facilities
Drinking water is provided by a combination of rainwater harvesting and seawater desalination. A Reverse osmosis seawater desalination plant was commissioned in 1996 and can supply up to 1.3 million litres of potable water per day. The plant's seawater intake is driven by two vertical turbine pumps installed on a purpose made jetty. Waste brine is discharged to a pit where it gravitates to an ocean outfall away from the seawater intake.

Transport 
Hamilton Island Airport is the only airport in the Whitsunday Islands that is big enough to cater for larger commercial aircraft. Hamilton Island is also served by several ferries, which can only carry passengers. Mainland motor vehicles are prohibited on the island with the exception of those for tradespeople and island public transport.

See also 

 Dent Island
 List of islands of Australia
 Tourism in Australia

References

External links

 Hamilton Island Official Website
 University of Queensland: Queensland Places: Hamilton Island

Whitsunday Islands
Ansett Australia
Coastal towns in Queensland